Rutger Sturkenboom (born 23 February 1970) is a Dutch Paralympic swimmer. In total he won four silver medals and four bronze medals at the Summer Paralympics.

References

External links 
 

Living people
1970 births
Place of birth missing (living people)
Dutch male freestyle swimmers
Swimmers at the 1988 Summer Paralympics
Swimmers at the 1992 Summer Paralympics
Swimmers at the 1996 Summer Paralympics
Swimmers at the 2000 Summer Paralympics
Medalists at the 2000 Summer Paralympics
Paralympic silver medalists for the Netherlands
Paralympic bronze medalists for the Netherlands
Paralympic medalists in swimming
Paralympic swimmers of the Netherlands
Dutch male breaststroke swimmers
Dutch male medley swimmers
S9-classified Paralympic swimmers
20th-century Dutch people
21st-century Dutch people